The Noida Sector 62 is a metro station on the Blue Line extension of the Delhi Metro railway, in the city of Noida in India.

History
Construction works begin in 2015 and was completed on March 8, 2019.

Station layout

Entry/Exit

See also
Delhi
List of Delhi Metro stations
Transport in Delhi
Delhi Suburban Railway
Delhi Monorail
Delhi Transport Corporation
South East Delhi
New Delhi
National Capital Region (India)
Noida–Greater Noida Expressway
Noida Metro
List of rapid transit systems
List of metro systems

References

External links

 Delhi Metro Rail Corporation Ltd. (Official site) 
 Delhi Metro Annual Reports
 
 UrbanRail.Net – Descriptions of all metro systems in the world, each with a schematic map showing all stations.

Delhi Metro stations
Railway stations in Gautam Buddh Nagar district
Transport in Noida